Children of the Light is a compilation album released in 1993 featuring the music of the Jackson 5. It is one of the three compilations of the group's music not produced by Motown or CBS Records.

Track listing
"The Love You Save" (from ABC)
"Ain't Nothing Like the Real Thing"
"Lookin' Through the Windows"
"Don't Let Your Baby Catch You"
"I Can Only Give You Love"
"Little Bitty Pretty One"
"Zip A Dee Doo Dah" (from Diana Ross Presents The Jackson 5)
"Ready or Not Here I Come (Can't Hide from Love)" (from Third Album)
"E-Ne-Me-Ne-Mi-Ne-Moe (The Choice is Yours to Pull)"
"If I Have to Move a Mountain"
"Don't Want to See Tomorrow"
"Children of the Light"
"Doctor My Eyes"
"My Cherie Amour" (from Diana Ross Presents The Jackson 5)

Ten of these songs were previously available on the album Lookin' Through the Windows (ie that whole album with the exception of "To Know").

In 2001, the album was rereleased in a box set with Early Classics and Music & Me

1993 compilation albums
The Jackson 5 compilation albums